Sanahasa Fernando (born 27 June 1978) is a Sri Lankan cricketer. He played 41 first-class and 33 List A matches for multiple domestic sides in Sri Lanka between 2001 and 2008. His last first-class match was for Lankan Cricket Club in the 2007–08 Premier Trophy on 22 February 2008.

See also
 List of Chilaw Marians Cricket Club players

References

External links
 

1978 births
Living people
Sri Lankan cricketers
Chilaw Marians Cricket Club cricketers
Lankan Cricket Club cricketers
Ragama Cricket Club cricketers
Place of birth missing (living people)